Ruszki may refer to the following places:
Ruszki, Kuyavian-Pomeranian Voivodeship (north-central Poland)
Ruszki, Łódź Voivodeship (central Poland)
Ruszki, Masovian Voivodeship (east-central Poland)